Paruthicheri is a village in the Kumbakonam taluk of Thanjavur district, Tamil Nadu, India.

Demographics 

As per the 2001 census, Paruthicheri had a total population of 1021 with 503 males and 513 females. The sex ratio was 1030. The literacy rate was 75.5

References 

 

Villages in Thanjavur district